Raymond Edmunds, also known as the Donvale Rapist and Mr. Stinky, born 12 March 1944 at Queen Victoria Hospital, Melbourne, Australia, is a convicted rapist and double murderer who was active in Victoria, Australia from the 1960s to the mid-1980s.

Crimes
In 1986, Edmunds was convicted of the murders of 18-year-old panel beater Garry Heywood and the rape and murder of 16-year-old Abina Madill at Murchison East, near Shepparton, Victoria. On 10 February 1966, the two co-workers had attended a rock concert with their respective friends at the Shepparton Civic Centre, but neither returned home. A few days later, two 17 year-olds on a shooting trip found Madill's decomposed remains, and then Heywood's body was found 200 metres away. Heywood had been shot through the head with a .22-calibre Mossberg self-loading rifle; Madill had been raped and bludgeoned to death.

Edmunds had allegedly previously raped and beaten his first wife and sexually abused his three-year-old daughter. Edmunds was also convicted of a series of rapes in the 1970s and early '80s that led the police to dub the then-unknown offender "The Donvale Rapist".

Edmunds was dubbed "Mr Stinky" by a sub-editor from Melbourne's Sunday Press newspaper due to his offensive body odour, which was believed to have been caused by a mixture of milk, manure and chemicals from his work as a sharecropping farmer on dairy properties.

Sergeant Andrew Wall, a Victoria Police fingerprint expert, matched two fingerprints found on the top of the Holden FJ owned by Heywood. This occurred before computerised processing of fingerprints was developed and fingerprint matching had to be done manually. The fingerprint evidence was deliberately kept quiet so as not to panic the offender or help him become more adept at hiding his prints. These fingerprints connected the Shepparton murders with one fingerprint found at the Donvale crime scene.

On 16 March 1985, Edmunds was arrested on unrelated charges of indecent exposure while parked in his station wagon in Albury, New South Wales. Edmunds pleaded guilty in Albury court to the charges, being fined $400 prior to his release. After his arrest Edmunds was fingerprinted and the prints were matched with those found at the Shepparton crime scene. At the time, NSW had mandatory fingerprinting, whereas in Victoria this was yet to become law. He was convicted and is now serving two life sentences with no minimum term for the murders and a total of 30 years for five rape convictions in Greensborough and Donvale.

It has been alleged that Edmunds committed other murders and more than 32 rapes, although he has maintained his innocence. Police sought to utilise new legislation that allows them to compel convicted prisoners to provide a blood sample for DNA testing. He was at one point a suspect in the case of missing Beaumaris girl, Eloise Worledge.

References

1944 births
Australian murderers of children
Australian people convicted of murder
Australian prisoners sentenced to multiple life sentences
Australian rapists
Biometrics
Crime in Oceania
Criminals from Melbourne
Living people
People convicted of murder by Victoria (Australia)
Prisoners sentenced to life imprisonment by Victoria (Australia)
Sexual violence in Oceania
Suspected serial killers